"2002" is a song by English singer and songwriter Anne-Marie. She co-wrote the song with Ed Sheeran, Julia Michaels, Benny Blanco and its producer Steve Mac. It was released on 20 April 2018 as the sixth single from Anne-Marie's debut studio album Speak Your Mind (2018). Other people officially credited as co-writers are Andreas Carlsson, George Clinton, El DeBarge, Randy DeBarge, Jay E, Ice-T, Etterlene Jordan, Kristian Lundin, Max Martin, Nelly, Alphonso Henderson, Jake Schulze and City Spud, due to co-writing or being sampled on one of the songs referenced in the chorus.

"2002" was a commercial success, becoming one of Anne-Marie's most successful singles worldwide. It peaked at number three on the UK singles chart, becoming Anne-Marie's fourth top-ten single at the time. The song has also reached the top ten in seven countries, including Australia, where it reached number four, Scotland where it peaked at number 3 and Ireland were it peaked at number 2. It was a massive success in South Korea, topping the country's year-end chart in 2019.

Background
"2002" is a love ballad about a childhood romance of Anne-Marie's that took place in the titular year. She wrote the song with Ed Sheeran, Benny Blanco, Julia Michaels and Steve Mac. She was not initially planning to release "2002" as a single, but finally caved in after constant pestering from Sheeran on Instagram to bring it out.

The beginning of the song's chorus, "Oops, I got 99 problems singing 'bye, bye, bye' / Hold up, if you wanna go and take a ride with me / Better hit me, baby, one more time", references six songs released between 1998 and 2004: "...Baby One More Time", "Oops!... I Did It Again", "99 Problems", "Bye Bye Bye", "The Next Episode" and "Ride wit Me". In an interview with Polish music magazine luvPOP, Anne-Marie explained the song: "It is all about that year, when I was that age just listening to that music that I loved at that time. You know, Christina Aguilera, Missy Elliott. All of these songs...Yeah, it just takes me back to that time." In a March 2017 interview, she mentioned Alanis Morissette as a big influence on her while growing up.

Composition 
The chord progression E–B–Cm–Gm–A–B–E is used in the verses; the progression Cm–A–E–B–A–B in the pre-choruses and bridge, A–E–B–Cm in the choruses, and E–B–Cm–A (the I–V–vi–IV progression) after the last chorus.

Music video
The official music video was directed by Hannah Lux Davis, who also directed the video for Anne-Marie's previous single "Friends". It was filmed in London and uploaded to YouTube on 8 May 2018. It features Anne-Marie recreating the videos of the songs referenced in the chorus.

As of October 2021, the video has gained over 600 million views and 4.2 million likes.

Charts

Weekly charts

Monthly charts

Year-end charts

Certifications

Release history

References

2018 singles
2018 songs
Anne-Marie (singer) songs
Song recordings produced by Steve Mac
Songs written by Ed Sheeran
Songs written by Julia Michaels
Songs written by Benny Blanco
Songs written by Steve Mac
Songs written by El DeBarge
Songs written by Andreas Carlsson
Songs written by George Clinton (funk musician)
Songs written by Ice-T
Songs written by Kristian Lundin
Songs written by Max Martin
Songs written by Nelly
Music videos directed by Hannah Lux Davis
Cultural depictions of Britney Spears
Songs about nostalgia
Synth-pop ballads
2010s ballads
Songs written by Anne-Marie (singer)
Fiction set in 2002
Asylum Records singles
Warner Records singles